is a Japanese music composer and arranger. He is best known for his work on anime, including Lucky Star, The Melancholy of Haruhi Suzumiya, Monogatari and Beastars. He worked at Namco, where he primarily composed soundtracks for video games. Since 2005, he has been affiliated with Keiichi Okabe's music production company Monaca, where he has often collaborated with his colleagues to produce soundtracks for anime and other media.

Biography 
Kōsaki was born on September 16, 1974 in Toyonaka, Osaka, Japan. He began playing the piano and Electone, at the age of three. He played the trumpet in his junior high school's brass band. As an information engineering student at Kyoto University, he developed an interest in composing music as a member of the amateur circle .

After his graduation in 1999, he was hired at Namco, where he composed tracks for video game series including Tekken and Kotoba no Puzzle, along with working as an in-house trumpeter for various games. During his time at Namco, he was also a member of Hiroshi Okubo's doujin circle nanosounds, where he contributed original tracks to a number of albums. He would also score the music for the OVA Munto 2: Beyond the Walls of Time using the alias Shinji Ikeda, as he was still employed at Namco at the time. Citing a desire to compose a greater variety of music, he left the company in 2005 to join Monaca, a production group founded the previous year by his former colleague Keiichi Okabe.

Kōsaki's first major project with Monaca was the soundtrack for the 2006 anime television series The Melancholy of Haruhi Suzumiya. Series production director Yutaka Yamamoto recommended Kōsaki as the composer for the anime, who found it difficult to get involved in such a large scale project outside of Namco, serving as another reason for quitting the company to join Monaca. An album containing three of his compositions ("God knows...", "Lost my music", and "Koi no Mikuru Densetsu") for the anime sold more than 136,000 copies in Japan and peaked at #5 on the weekly Oricon Singles Chart. "God knows..." in particular has received a lot of acclaim, although Kōsaki found it challenging to compose due to having little experience with band recording and playing guitar.

In 2007, he composed the soundtrack for the anime television series Lucky Star; the series' opening theme "Motekke! Sailor Fuku" peaked at #2 on the chart upon release. It would also go on to win the 2007 Radio Kansai Award, a subset of the Animation Kobe Theme Song Award. He found the workload overwhelming, as prior to joining Monaca he was not used to composing a large number of tracks under time constraints.

In December 2010, he announced an indefinite hiatus from his work due to poor health. He began a second illness-related hiatus in February 2014 and returned to work in January 2015.

In 2019, he worked on the anime Beastars, which features gypsy-inspired music. In 2020, a compilation album titled Satoru Kosaki 20th Anniversary Selected Works "DAWN" was released to commemorate 20 years of being a composer. It includes a selection of his most successful songs, while the limited edition release also includes a selection of anime BGM. In 2021, he composed for the anime Vivy: Fluorite Eye's Song; the following year, the anime won the Best Music Anime award at AniTrendz's 8th Annual Anime Trending Awards. He aimed to compose powerful songs to correspond with the story and imagery, and has been happy to see his work receive such high praise.

Works

Anime

Video games

Other

References

External links
 Profile at Monaca 
 Discography at VGMdb
 

1974 births
21st-century Japanese male musicians
Anime composers
Bandai Namco Holdings
Japanese composers
Japanese film score composers
Japanese male composers
Japanese male film score composers
Japanese music arrangers
Japanese television composers
Living people
Male television composers
Musicians from Osaka
Namco
People from Toyonaka, Osaka
Video game composers